Aubergina is a genus of butterflies in the family Lycaenidae. The species of this genus are found in the Neotropical realm.

Species
Aubergina vanessoides (Prittwitz, 1865)
Aubergina paetus (Godman & Salvin, [1887])
Aubergina hicetas (Godman & Salvin, [1887])
Aubergina alda (Hewitson, 1868)
Aubergina hesychia (Godman & Salvin, [1887])

References

External links

Eumaeini
Lycaenidae of South America
Lycaenidae genera